Paul Amman (31 August 1634 – 4 February 1691), German physician and botanist.

Biography
Amman was born at Breslau in 1634. In 1662 he received the degree of doctor of physic from the university of Leipzig, and in 1664 was admitted a member of the society Naturae Curiosorum, under the name of Dryander. Shortly afterwards he was chosen extraordinary professor of medicine in the above-mentioned university; and in 1674 he was promoted to the botanical chair, which he again in 1682 exchanged for the physiological. He died at Leipzig in 1691. He seems to have been a man of critical mind and extensive learning.

Works
His principal works were:
Medicina Critica (1670); 
Paraenesis ad Docentes occupata circa Institutionum Medicarum Emendationem (1673); 
Irenicum Numae Pompilii cum Hippocrate (1689); 
Supellex Botanica (1675); 
Character Naturalis Plantarum (1676).

References

Attribution

External links
 :de:Paul Ammann

17th-century German physicians
17th-century German botanists
1634 births
1691 deaths
Physicians from Wrocław
17th-century German writers
17th-century German male writers
Scientists from Wrocław